Yao Lei (born 24 February 1990) is a Chinese-born Singaporean former badminton player.

Early life 
In 2003, as a 13-year-old Yao emigrated to Singapore under the Foreign Sports Talent Scheme. Her parents Yao Yiping and Gu Xiaojing were both former international badminton players.

Career 
Yao won the women's doubles silver and mixed doubles bronze at the 2010 Delhi Commonwealth Games. She also represented Singapore in the 2012 Summer Olympics in London with Shinta Mulia Sari.

Yao retired from competitive badminton in 2014, citing a lack of passion and drive. Yao had enrolled at Soochow University in China for a degree in sports training.

In 2018, Yao finished her studies. She participated in the 2018 Singapore Open, pairing with Lim Ming Hui in the women's doubles and Malaysian Tan Boon Heong in the mixed doubles.

Achievements

Commonwealth Games 
Women's doubles

Mixed doubles

Southeast Asian Games 
Women's doubles

BWF World Junior Championships 
Girls' doubles

Asian Junior Championships 
Girls' doubles

BWF Superseries 
The BWF Superseries, which was launched on 14 December 2006 and implemented in 2007, was a series of elite badminton tournaments, sanctioned by the Badminton World Federation (BWF). BWF Superseries levels were Superseries and Superseries Premier. A season of Superseries consisted of twelve tournaments around the world that had been introduced since 2011. Successful players were invited to the Superseries Finals, which were held at the end of each year.

Women's doubles

  BWF Superseries Finals tournament
  BWF Superseries Premier tournament
  BWF Superseries tournament

BWF Grand Prix 
The BWF Grand Prix had two levels, the Grand Prix and Grand Prix Gold. It was a series of badminton tournaments sanctioned by the Badminton World Federation (BWF) and played between 2007 and 2017.

Women's doubles

Mixed doubles

  BWF Grand Prix Gold tournament
  BWF Grand Prix tournament

BWF International Challenge/Series 
Women's doubles

Mixed doubles

  BWF International Challenge tournament
  BWF International Series tournament

References

External links
 
 
 
 
 
 
  (2010)
  (2014)

1990 births
Living people
Sportspeople from Nantong
Badminton players from Jiangsu
Chinese emigrants to Singapore
Singaporean sportspeople of Chinese descent
Naturalised citizens of Singapore
Chinese female badminton players
Singaporean female badminton players
Badminton players at the 2012 Summer Olympics
Olympic badminton players of Singapore
Badminton players at the 2010 Asian Games
Badminton players at the 2014 Asian Games
Asian Games competitors for Singapore
Badminton players at the 2010 Commonwealth Games
Badminton players at the 2014 Commonwealth Games
Commonwealth Games silver medallists for Singapore
Commonwealth Games bronze medallists for Singapore
Commonwealth Games medallists in badminton
Competitors at the 2007 Southeast Asian Games
Competitors at the 2009 Southeast Asian Games
Competitors at the 2011 Southeast Asian Games
Competitors at the 2013 Southeast Asian Games
Southeast Asian Games silver medalists for Singapore
Southeast Asian Games bronze medalists for Singapore
Southeast Asian Games medalists in badminton
Medallists at the 2010 Commonwealth Games
Medallists at the 2014 Commonwealth Games